Plateia is a village of the Volvi municipality. Before the 2011 local government reform it was part of the municipality of Apollonia. The 2011 census recorded 27 inhabitants in the village. Plateia is a part of the community of Peristerona.

See also
 List of settlements in the Thessaloniki regional unit

References

Populated places in Thessaloniki (regional unit)